Dorothy Elizabeth Stahl Brady (June 14, 1903 – April 17, 1977) was an American mathematician and economist. She was a professor of economics at Wharton School of the University of Pennsylvania from 1958 to 1970.

Early life
Born in Elk River, Minnesota, she grew up in Portland, Oregon, attending Lincoln High School and later Reed College studying mathematics and physics. She was married to fellow Reed student Robert A. Brady from 1924 to 1936, they had a son in 1933.

Education and Career
Brady earned a master’s degree in mathematics from Cornell University in 1926, then worked as an instructor at Vassar College, as a research assistant at the National Bureau of Economic Research, and a studied and taught at New York University. She went on to complete a Ph.D. in mathematics from University of California, Berkeley in 1933, and was the 6th woman ever to do so.

Brady went on to a long career in government working for the U.S. Department of Agriculture and the U.S. Department of Labor where she was the chief of the cost of living division from 1944 to 1948, and the Bureau of Labor Statistics where she was the chief of division of prices and cost of living in 1953.

She returned to academia as a professor in 1956 at the University of Chicago, was chairman of the graduate group in economic history from 1964-1970 at the Wharton School of the University of Pennsylvania.  She continued to consult to the Bureau of Labor Statistics and the Social Security Administration during her academic tenure.

Honors
She received the National Women’s Press Club Award in Economics, became a fellow of the Econometric Association, and was book review editor of the Journal of Economic History from 1969-1974. Brady became a Fellow of the American Statistical Association in 1949.

References 

1903 births
1977 deaths
People from Elk River, Minnesota
20th-century American mathematicians
Reed College alumni
Cornell University alumni
UC Berkeley College of Letters and Science alumni
University of Chicago faculty
Wharton School of the University of Pennsylvania faculty
Women mathematicians
American women economists
Lincoln High School (Portland, Oregon) alumni
Fellows of the American Statistical Association
Economists from Minnesota
20th-century American economists
American women statisticians
20th-century American women